Gisleham is a village and civil parish in the English county of Suffolk. The parish is in the East Suffolk district, situated between Carlton Colville and Kessingland.

The parish had a population of 778 at the 2011 United Kingdom census. The main A12 road cuts through the eastern portion of the parish close to the North Sea coast. The coastal section of the parish to the east of the main road has developed as a series of holiday parks, including a large Pontins park. The parish extends south as far as the Hundred River where it borders Henstead with Hulver Street and Rushmere parishes.

History
The place name of Gisleham derives from the Old English gysla and ham, meaning "Gysla's Village".

Gisleham Manor is a moated site dating to the 13th-century. A house once existed that was enclosed within the moats, and is likely to have been a fortified manor house. The house and associated buildings no longer exist.The site is a scheduled monument.

The lordship of Gisleham Manor was held by a number of families in succession.

Culture and community
Residential development at Bloodmoor Hill on the edge of Carlton Colville has led to a rapid growth in the parish population since the 1980s when it stood at 456. The South Lowestoft Industrial Estate, including a number of large retail stores, has also been built where the parish borders Pakefield on the southern edge of Lowestoft.

The traditional area of the village is centred around the parish church and extends in a linear style. It includes an area of housing at Black Street in the south of the parish and development to the north around the site of the former Gisleham Middle School. This was closed in 2011 as part of a reorganisation of schools in parts of Suffolk, and is now the site of Carlton Colville Primary School.

Holy Trinity church 
Holy Trinity church is one of around 40 round-tower churches in Suffolk. The church has a late Saxon or early Norman round base topped with a 15th-century octagonal brick crown. The medieval church was restored in 1861 and 1887, and the chancel in 1902 to 1908. It is a Grade I listed building.

Notes

References

External links

Website with photos of Gisleham Holy Trinity, a round-tower church

Villages in Suffolk
Civil parishes in Suffolk
Waveney District